San Bernardo Municipality may refer to:
 San Bernardo Municipality, Durango
 San Bernardo Municipality, Narino - San Bernardo, Nariño
 San Bernardo Municipality, Cundinamarca - San Bernardo, Cundinamarca

Municipality name disambiguation pages